Gérard ("Gé") van Dijk (15 August 1923 in Amsterdam – 29 May 2005) was a football player and coach.

Club career
He played his entire career (1943–1957) for Ajax, won two Eredivisie titles (1947 and 1957). He played 317 league matches and scored 80 goals and was the top goalscorer for the team in the 1950-51 season. He famously refused an offer to play for Italian side Novara in 1952 because he deemed it too rude to leave Ajax.

International career
He won two caps for the Netherlands national football team from 1947 to 1948, in friendlies against Switzerland and Belgium.

Personal life

Death
Van Dijk died in May 2005.

References

External links
 

1923 births
2005 deaths
Footballers from Amsterdam
Association football forwards
Dutch footballers
Netherlands international footballers
AFC Ajax players